Robert Marc may refer to:

 Robert Marc (fencer), French Olympic fencer
 Robert Marc (artist) (1943–1993), French artist
 Robert E. Marc, American neuroscientist

See also
Robert Mark (disambiguation)